Nevada is a 1944 Western film based on a Zane Grey novel and starring a 27-year-old Robert Mitchum, with Anne Jeffreys, Guinn "Big Boy" Williams, and Richard Martin in supporting roles. The film was written by Norman Houston from Grey's popular novel and directed by Edward Killy. Mitchum is billed with "Introducing Bob Mitchum as Jim Lacy" at the film's beginning. Although this was not Mitchum's first movie, it was his first lead role; he had previously played mainly villains.

Richard Martin also played sidekick "Chito Rafferty" in thirty other western movies, most of which starred screen cowboy Tim Holt, who had joined the service during World War II when Nevada was produced. Martin played this same character set in different times, both contemporary and the Old West.

This version is a remake of the 1927 silent film Nevada starring Gary Cooper, Thelma Todd, and William Powell. This is the only time that Gary Cooper and Robert Mitchum played the same role in two different films.

The following year, Mitchum again played the lead in another Zane Grey movie with the same writer and director titled West of the Pecos also featuring Richard Martin as Chito Rafferty.

Cast
 Robert Mitchum as Nevada Lacy (billed as "Bob Mitchum")
 Anne Jeffreys as Julie Dexter
 Guinn "Big Boy" Williams as Dusty
 Nancy Gates as Hattie Ide
 Richard Martin as Chito Rafferty
 Craig Reynolds as	Cash Burridge

References

External links

1944 films
1944 Western (genre) films
Films based on works by Zane Grey
American Western (genre) films
Films based on American novels
Films directed by Edward Killy
American black-and-white films
Films scored by Paul Sawtell
1940s English-language films
1940s American films